The following is a list of cities that have current tram/streetcar (including heritage trams/heritage streetcars), or light rail systems as part of their regular public transit systems. In other words, this list only includes systems which operate year-round and provide actual transit service, not ones that are primarily tourist services, are seasonal-only, or are excursion-type tram operations.

Some transit systems branded as "light rail" such as the Docklands Light Railway in London, Ampang Line and Kelana Jaya Line of Kuala Lumpur, Malaysia qualify as metro systems (see medium-capacity rail system) and thus are not listed here – see List of metro systems.

Only currently operational tram and LRT systems are included in this listing – tram and LRT systems that have "suspended operation" or are presently under construction are excluded.

Legend
 Location Primary city served by the tram/streetcar or light rail system. 
 Country Sovereign state in which the tram/streetcar or light rail system is located.
 SystemThe English name of the tram system or overview article for city.
 Year opened The year the system opened for passenger service. For older systems, this may refer to horsecar service for those systems continuously in operation since their horsecar era.
 Stations The number of stations in the network, as quoted by the system's operator.
 System length The system length of a tram/streetcar or light rail network is the sum of the lengths of all routes in the rail network in kilometers (or miles). Each section of track is counted only once, regardless of how many lines pass over it, and regardless of whether it is single-track or multi-track, single carriageway or dual carriageway.
 Type Defines whether the system in question is a tram/streetcar system or a light rail transit system (or, in a few cases, whether the system is a heritage streetcar system).

Africa

Asia 

All systems in Russia, including those in Asia, are listed together, for convenience, in the Europe section of this article, similarly all systems in Egypt are listed in the Africa section.

Europe 

All systems in Kazakhstan and Turkey, including those in Europe, are listed together, for convenience, in the Asia section of this article.

See also 

 List of town tramway systems in Austria
 List of town tramway systems in Belarus
 Trams in Belgium
 Trams in France
 Trams in Germany
 List of town tramway systems in Italy
 List of town tramway systems in the Netherlands
 List of town tramway systems in Romania
 List of town tramway systems in Russia
 List of town tramway systems in Ukraine
 List of town tramway systems in the United Kingdom

North America 

The following systems provide regular transit service daily and year-round in North America, including those systems or lines using vintage or faux-vintage streetcars. For other heritage streetcar lines, ones with more limited service, see Streetcars in North America. North America, specifically more so the United States, once had extensive tram networks in almost all cities, but nearly all were removed for bus operations between the 1940s and the 1960s. These systems are listed at List of streetcar systems in the United States.

See also 

 Light rail in Canada
 Light rail in the United States
 Streetcars in North America
 List of North American light rail systems by ridership
 List of rail transit systems in the United States
 List of street railways in Canada
 List of street railways in Mexico
 List of streetcar systems in the United States
 List of town tramway systems in Central America
 List of town tramway systems in North America
 List of United States light rail systems by ridership

Oceania

South America

See also
 List of Latin American rail transit systems by ridership

Gallery

See also 

 Tram and light rail transit systems
List of largest town tramway systems
 List of town tramway systems (all-time list)
 List of metro systems
 Medium-capacity rail transport system
 List of suburban and commuter rail systems
 List of trolleybus systems

Notes

References

External links
 World list of Light Rail, Trams and Metros at Light Rail Transit Association (LRTA.org) website, through 2019
 World Rail Transit List

Tram and light rail
Light rail